Joseph Augustine Wade (1796 – 15 July 1845) was an Irish composer and conductor. Wade was popular in his lifetime, and he was quoted in the 1919 Bartlett's Familiar Quotations.

Life and career
Wade was born in Dublin and worked as a surgeon before moving to London in 1821. For a short period he was conductor at the King's Theatre. He had some success with his oratorio The Prophecy (1824) and the comic opera The Two Houses of Grenada (1826).

Wade was known for his arrangement of Peter Gray as well as for popular songs that included I've Wandered in Dreams, Love was Once a Little Boy, A Woodland Life, and his most famous, Meet me by Moonlight. Walt Whitman referred to Wade, having his eponymous hero in Samuel Sensitive sing a phrase of Wade's Meet me by Moonlight.

His son Joseph Augustine Wade jr. was also a composer.

Selected works
Stage
 Two Houses of Granada, comic opera (1826)
 The Convent Belles, comic opera (1833)
 The Yeoman's Daughter, musical play (1834)
 The Pupil of Da Vinci, burletta (1839)

Vocal
 Come Buy me Cherries (c.1820)
 The Hermit of Killarney, Irish ballad (c.1820)
 The Prophecy, oratorio (1824)
 Hours There Were, ballad (1825)
 Where Stays my Lover's Barque, ballad for 3 voices (c.1825)
 Farewell Sweet Whispering Echo, glee (c.1826)
 Say Will Summer Roses Bloom, duet (c.1828)
 Meet me by Moonlight, ballad (c.1830)
 Shula Agra, Irish ballad (c.1830)
 The Faithless One (c.1830)
 Polish Melodies (1831)
 I have Fruit, I have Flow'rs, cavatina (c.1840)

Piano
 A Grand Duet for Two Performers on the Piano Forte (1827)

Writings
 The Hand-Book to the Piano Forte (London, 1844)

References

External links

 
 Works by J.A. Wade at IMSLP

1796 births
1845 deaths
19th-century classical composers
19th-century Irish people
19th-century male musicians
Irish classical composers
Irish conductors (music)
Irish expatriates in the United Kingdom
Irish opera composers
Male opera composers
Musicians from Dublin (city)